Janne Immonen (born 29 May 1968) is a Finnish former cross-country skier who competed from 1993 to 2003.  He was best known for his doping role in the 2001 FIS Nordic World Ski Championships doping scandal that would affect five other Finnish skiers for taking hydroxyethyl starch (HES), a blood plasma expander.  Immonen was part of the 4 × 10 km relay team that finished first, but would be disqualified for his blood doping and would receive a two-year suspension from the FIS as a result.  He also finished 10th in the 30 km event at those same championships. In 2013, Immonen received a 6-month suspended sentence after the Helsinki District Court found that he had committed perjury when witnessing to the court in 2011 that he was unaware of any doping use in the 1990s.

Immonen's best individual career  World Cup finish was third in Otepää in 2001.

Cross-country skiing results
All results are sourced from the International Ski Federation (FIS).

World Championships

World Cup

Season standings

Individual podiums
 1 podium

Team podiums
 4 podiums (4 )

See also
List of sportspeople sanctioned for doping offences

References

External links
 

1968 births
Living people
Finnish male cross-country skiers
Finnish sportspeople in doping cases
Doping cases in cross-country skiing
People from Sotkamo
Sportspeople from Kainuu